Dyson may refer to:

 Dyson (surname), people with the surname Dyson
 Dyson (company), a Singaporean multinational home appliances company founded by James Dyson
 Dyson (crater), a crater on the Moon
 Dyson (operating system), a Unix general-purpose operating system derived from Debian using the illumos kernel, libc, and SMF init system
 Dyson sphere, a hypothetical megastructure that completely encompasses a star and captures most or all of its power output
 Dyson tree, a hypothetical plant suggested by physicist Freeman Dyson
 Eufloria (formerly called Dyson), a video game based on the idea of Dyson trees
 , a United States Navy destroyer in commission from 1942 to 1947
 NOAAS Oscar Dyson (R 224), an American fisheries and oceanographic research ship in commission in the National Oceanic and Atmospheric Administration since 2005
 Dysons, an Australian bus operator
 Dyson, a character in the Canadian television series Lost Girl

See also
 Dysan, storage media company